St. Ladislaus Roman Catholic Church was a historic church at 2908 Wood Avenue in Lorain, Ohio.

It was built in 1904 and added to the National Register in 1982. The church was closed in 2010 along with other local churches as part of a "reconfiguration" by the Roman Catholic Diocese of Cleveland. Statues from the church were restored and later added to the Museum of Divine Statues in Lakewood, Ohio in April 2011.

References

Roman Catholic churches completed in 1904
Churches in the Roman Catholic Diocese of Cleveland
Churches on the National Register of Historic Places in Ohio
Romanesque Revival church buildings in Ohio
Churches in Lorain County, Ohio
National Register of Historic Places in Lorain County, Ohio
Buildings and structures in Lorain, Ohio
Former Roman Catholic church buildings in Ohio
20th-century Roman Catholic church buildings in the United States